Javad Hamidi (1918 – 2002) was an Iranian Modernist painter, poet, and educator. He was a pioneer in modern art in Iran.

Biography 

Javad Hamidi was born in 1918 in Hamadan, Qajar Iran. Hamidi studied in the Faculty of Fine Arts at Tehran University (now University of Tehran), and graduated in 1946; and at Beaux-Arts de Paris. His classmate was Shokouh Riazi, who studied alongside him in both Tehran and in Paris. He continued his studies under French painter André Lhote.

Hamidi had been a founding member of the "Fighting Cock Society" (Khorūs-e Jangi), an artists group in Iran dedicated to the modern art movement and surrealism. Hamidi taught painting in Tehran University for almost 40 years, as well as taught at Al-Zahra, Azad and Tarbiat-Modares Universities.

He was killed by a speeding motorcycle in Tehran in 2002.

References

External links
Artfacts
Caroun
Tehran Museum of Contemporary Arts

1918 births
2002 deaths
People from Hamadan
University of Tehran alumni
Pedestrian road incident deaths
Academic staff of the University of Tehran
Academic staff of Tarbiat Modares University
20th-century Iranian painters
Road incident deaths in Iran
École des Beaux-Arts alumni